Bashir Khrayyef (April 10, 1917 – December 17, 1983) was a Tunisian writer who is considered "the father of the realist novel in Tunisia." He is famous for his harshly realistic descriptions of Tunisian society, as well as for his use of Tunisian Arabic in the dialogues of his novels.

Early life and education 
Khrayyef was born on April 10, 1917 in Nefta, government of Tozeur in southwest Tunisia. He came from a literary family; his brother was the poet Mustafa Khrayyef.

Writing career 
Khrayyef's most famous historical novel,  (Night lightning, 1961) is set in Tunis during the 16th century Hafsid rule. The novel treats the topics of slavery and racism through the love story of the protagonist, a black slave.

His most influential novel,  (A date in its cluster, 1969), is set in an oasis community in the southwest desert of Tunisia. The remoteness of the community is emphasized through the use of a local dialect of Tunisian Arabic.

His final novel,  (Your love is maddening, 1980) recounts an impossible love between a man and a prostitute.

Bibliography

Novels 
(1961) Barq al-layl ( (Night lightning))
(1969) al-Digla fī ‘arājīnihā ( (A date in its cluster))
(1980)  ( (Your love is maddening)), written in 1958

Short Story Collections 

 (1975) Mashmūm al-Full ( (Jasmine bouquet)), included the stories "Khalīfat al-ʼaqraʻ"  and "Maḥfaẓa al-samār" ( (The woven wallet)), previously published in the magazine al-Fikr in 1965 and 1970

Other Stories 
Nokhal Baya (1936)
 Lilet loutya (1937)
 Hobbek derbani (1959)
 Ballara (1992)

Awards 

 Ali Belhouane Municipal Prize, 1960
 Grand Prize for Literature and Thought, 1981
 Great Mantle of Culture, 1990

References

20th-century Tunisian writers
Tunisian writers in Tunisian Arabic
Tunisian novelists
1917 births
1983 deaths